Get Smart is an American comedy television series that satirizes the secret agent genre. Created by Mel Brooks and Buck Henry, the series stars Don Adams (as Maxwell Smart, Agent 86), Barbara Feldon (as Agent 99), and Edward Platt (as the Chief). It was initially broadcast from September 18, 1965 to May 15, 1970, the first four seasons on NBC, and the last on CBS. It ran for five seasons, with 138 half-hour episodes being produced in total. 

The pilot episode was filmed in black-and-white, but the entire ensuing series was filmed in color. 

Like most sitcoms of its time, Get Smart was not serialized, so the episodes generally have no relation to each other.

Each of the five seasons has been released on DVD by HBO; also, the entire series has been released in a single box set, first by Time Life, then by HBO.

On August 10, 2015, the entire series was officially released on digital streaming platforms for the first time in preparation for the series 50th anniversary.

Series overview

Episodes

Season 1 (1965–66) 
Debuting on September 18, 1965, the series aired on Saturday nights following I Dream of Jeannie and opposite The Lawrence Welk Show (ABC) and The Trials of O'Brien (CBS).

The season earned executive producer Leonard Stern an Emmy nomination for Outstanding Comedy Series and Don Adams for Outstanding Continued Performance by an Actor in a Leading Role in a Comedy Series. Two episodes were nominated for Primetime Emmy Awards: "Diplomat's Daughter" for Outstanding Directorial Achievement in Comedy (Paul Bogart) and "Mr. Big" for Outstanding Writing Achievement in Comedy (Buck Henry and Mel Brooks).

{{Episode table |background=#ffd700|overall=4 |season=4 |title=19 |director=15 |writer=20 |airdate=14 |prodcode=7 |episodes=

{{Episode list
|EpisodeNumber   = 1
|EpisodeNumber2  = 1
|Title           = Mr. Big
|DirectedBy      = Howard Morris
|WrittenBy       = Mel Brooks and Buck Henry
|OriginalAirDate = 
|ProdCode        = 001
|ShortSummary    = Maxwell Smart must defeat the sinister Mr. Big, who is using a device called the Inthermo to threaten New York City. Michael Dunn, who would go on to star as The Wild Wild Wests Dr. Miguelito Loveless, stars as KAOS's Mr. Big.Note''': This was the only black and white episode of Get Smart; all others were in color.
|LineColor       = ffd700
}}

}}

 Season 2 (1966–67) 
The second season of Get Smart aired on Saturday nights following Please Don't Eat the Daisies and opposite The Lawrence Welk Show (ABC) and Pistols 'n' Petticoats (CBS).

 Season 3 (1967–68) 
For the third season, Get Smart aired on Saturday nights following Maya and opposite The Lawrence Welk Show (ABC) and My Three Sons (CBS).

 Season 4 (1968–69) 
Season Four of Get Smart aired on Saturday nights following Adam-12 and opposite The Newlywed Game (ABC) and the second half of The Jackie Gleason Show (CBS). It was the last season on NBC.

 Season 5 (1969–70) 
After its move to CBS, the series aired on Friday nights at 7:30 (replacing The Wild Wild West), opposite Let's Make a Deal (ABC) and The High Chaparral'' (NBC). This is the series' final season.

Home media

References

External links 
 
 Carl's Complete Get Smart Website

E
Lists of American sitcom episodes